Alvan or Alavan may refer to:

 Alvan (singer), a French singer
 Alvan (biblical figure), a minor biblical figure
 Alvan, East Azerbaijan, a village in East Azerbaijan Province, Iran
 Alvan, Iran, a city in Khuzestan Province
 Alvan, Shadegan, a village in Khuzestan Province
 Alvan-e Eshareh, a village in Khuzestan Province
 Alvan-e Moslem, a village in Khuzestan Province
 Alavan, West Azerbaijan, a village in West Azerbaijan Province, Iran

See also
 Alvin (disambiguation)